Lee Academy is a grade 7–12 private school in Clarksdale, Mississippi.

The school opened in 1970 as a segregation academy, with an initial enrollment of 654 students. In 1970, when Clarksdale submitted to integration, the public schools closed for an "integration break". When they reopened after a one-day hiatus, nearly all of the white students transferred to Lee or other segregation academies.

As of 1986, the school had never had a black student. The headmaster at the time, Gene Barbor, told a newspaper that the school "would admit blacks as long as they were cultured or want a college prep background. We wouldn't take any shuckers or jivers."

In 2001, Bob Edward, the former Clarksdale Municipal School District superintendent, recalled that the opening of Lee Academy was "the worst thing that ever happened to our schools." He explained that when the public schools integrated, white families "ran" to private schools.

Many members of the football team at Coahoma County High School transferred to Lee Academy as integration via court order was about to occur.

As of 2019, the school's official history page stated that the school was founded to ensure "retention of local control of policies". The history page was deleted sometime between February 2020 and April 2021.

 92% of the students were white. This differed from Clarksdale High School, where 92% were black.

See also
Coahoma Agricultural High School

References

External links
 Lee Academy

Private middle schools in Mississippi
Private high schools in Mississippi
Schools in Coahoma County, Mississippi
Segregation academies in Mississippi
1970 establishments in Mississippi
Educational institutions established in 1970